The 2002 Heineken Cup Final was the final match of the 2001–02 Heineken Cup, the seventh season of Europe's top club rugby union competition. The match was played on 25 May 2002 at the Millennium Stadium in Cardiff; this was the third time the final had been played in Cardiff after the 1996 and 1997 finals, but the first since the opening of the Millennium Stadium, which was built on the site of the old Cardiff Arms Park for the 1999 Rugby World Cup.

The match was contested by Leicester Tigers of England and Munster of Ireland. Munster were appearing in their second final after losing the 2000 Heineken Cup Final to Northampton Saints. Tigers were the defending champions having beaten Stade Français in the 2001 Heineken Cup Final and were appearing in their third final after losing the 1997 final to Brive.

Leicester Tigers won the match 15–9, becoming the first team to successfully defend the trophy. In the first minute, Tigers had a try by Freddie Tuilagi ruled out for illegal blocking on Munster wing John Kelly. Munster took a 3–0 lead from Ronan O'Gara's penalty before Tigers had a second try ruled out inside the first 10 minutes, Martin Johnson had pounced on a Frankie Sheahan over throw but referee Joël Jutge was not ready and the throw re-taken. After 20 minutes O'Gara slotted his second penalty for a 6–0 lead after Lewis Moody had been ruled offside. Geordan Murphy scored Tigers first try after a sweeping break from Tim Stimpson and dummy before finding Murphy to make it 6–5 when the conversion was missed. A scrum penalty against Darren Garforth gave O'Gara his third penalty goal for a 9–5 lead. However, once Harry Ellis, a try scorer in the semi final, was introduced on 52 minutes, the game swung into Leicester's favour. Tigers turned down kicks at goal in search of the try that came when Austin Healey darted over, Tim Stimpson's conversion gave Leicester a 12–9 lead. O'Gara missed an opportunity to level the scorers, and seconds later Stimpson slotted the last points of the game for a 15–9 final score. More drama was to come, though, as Munster wing Kelly thought he had scored in the corner, only to be denied by a last-ditch cover tackle by man of the match Healey.

Match details

See also
2001–02 Heineken Cup

References

Final
2002
2001–02 in Irish rugby union
2001–02 in Welsh rugby union
Sports competitions in Cardiff
2001–02 in English rugby union
2000s in Cardiff
Leicester Tigers matches
Munster Rugby matches